Coop! The Music of Bob Cooper is an album by saxophonist Bob Cooper recorded in 1957 and released on the Contemporary label.

Reception

The Allmusic review by Scott Yanow states: "a near-classic and one of his finest recordings... This set is an underrated gem".

Track listing
All compositions by Bob Cooper except as indicated
 "Jazz Theme and Four Variations"
 "Main Theme: Sunday Mood" - 4:04
 "1st Variation: A Blue Period" - 4:09
 "2nd Variation: Happy Changes" - 4:03
 "3rd Variation: Night Stroll" - 6:38
 "4th Variation: Saturday Dance" - 4:42
 "Confirmation" (Charlie Parker) - 4:18
 "Easy Living" (Ralph Rainger, Leo Robin) - 4:19
 "Frankie and Johnny" (Traditional) - 5:50
 "Day Dream" (Duke Ellington, Billy Strayhorn) - 3:25
 "Somebody Loves Me" (George Gershwin, Ballard MacDonald, Buddy DeSylva) - 3:19

Personnel
Bob Cooper - tenor saxophone
Frank Rosolino - trombone
Lou Levy - piano
Max Bennett - bass
Mel Lewis - drums
Conte Candoli, Pete Candoli, Don Fagerquist - trumpet (track 1.1-1.4)
Johnny Halliburton - trombone (track 1.1-1.4)
Victor Feldman - vibraphone (tracks 2-6)

References

Contemporary Records albums
Bob Cooper (musician) albums
1958 albums